Ryszard Smolarek (born May 10, 1952 in Koło) is a Polish manager, politician, and Member of Parliament in the Polish Republic. He was a Member of Parliament from 1989 to 2001.

Biography
Son of Mary and Joseph Smolarek. He finished Agricultural Technical School in Kościelec and in 1976 he graduated from the Warsaw University of Life Sciences.

Career
In 1989 he was elected a Member of Parliament from the Polish United Workers' Party (PZPR). In the Cabinets of Waldemar Pawlak, Józef Oleksy and Włodzimierz Cimoszewicz (1993–1997) he served as a Deputy Minister in the Ministry of Agriculture. He was responsible for the law establishing The Agency for Restructuring and Modernisation of Agriculture. In the years 1991-2001 he was a Member of Parliament from the Polish People's Party (PSL) from Siedlce province. He has worked in the Committee of Agriculture and Food Economy. In 1992-1996 and 2001-2002 he was a member of the Sejm and Senate of the Republic of Poland delegation to the Parliamentary Assembly of the Council of Europe in Strasbourg where he was part of a faction of the European People's Party. In 2001-2003, he was an advisor of the President of the Agricultural Market Agency.

He became a president of the meat plant "Łmeat-Łuków" S.A. in Łuków. He co-founded the Polish Federation of the Meat Industry, in which he took now the position of chairman of the board. He is also a vice-president of the board of the Polish-Belarusian Chamber of Commerce and a member of the PSL in Garwolin authorities.

Honors and awards
In 1986 he received the Bronze Cross of Merit.

References

1952 births
Living people
Polish chief executives
Polish United Workers' Party members
University of Warsaw alumni